The 1998-99 season of the FA Women's Premier League was the 8th season of the former top flight of English women's association football.

National Division

References

Ilkeston Football

Premier League
women
FA Women's National League seasons
1